These are the full results of the athletics competition at the 2018 South American Games which took place between 5 and 8 June 2018, in Cochabamba, Bolivia.

Men's results

100 meters

Heats – 6 JuneWind:Heat 1: -1.1 m/s, Heat 2: -0.1 m/s

Final – 6 JuneWind:-0.7 m/s

200 meters

Heats – 7 JuneWind:Heat 1: -1.0 m/s, Heat 2: +0.7 m/s

Final – 7 JuneWind:-0.5 m/s

400 meters

Heats – 5 June

Final – 6 June

800 meters
8 June

1500 meters
6 June

5000 meters
5 June

10,000 meters
8 June

110 meters hurdles

Heats – 6 JuneWind:Heat 1: -0.5 m/s, Heat 2: -0.2 m/s

Final – 6 JuneWind:+0.5 m/s

400 meters hurdles

Heats – 6 June

Final – 7 June

3000 meters steeplechase
8 June

4 × 100 meters relay
7 June

4 × 400 meters relay
8 June

20 kilometers walk
5 June

50 kilometres walk
5 June

High jump
6 June

Pole vault
8 June

Long jump
5 June

Triple jump
7 June

Shot put
7 June

Discus throw
8 June

Hammer throw
5 June

Javelin throw
6 June

Decathlon
5–6 June

Women's results

100 meters

Heats – 6 JuneWind:Heat 1: -1.5 m/s, Heat 2: -1.2 m/s

Final – 6 JuneWind:-0.7 m/s

200 meters
7 JuneWind: +1.0 m/s

400 meters

Heats – 5 June

Final – 6 June

800 meters
8 June

1500 meters
6 June

5000 meters
7 June

10,000 meters
5 June

100 meters hurdles

Heats – 6 JuneWind:Heat 1: -0.4 m/s, Heat 2: -0.5 m/s

Final – 6 JuneWind:+0.2 m/s

400 meters hurdles
7 June

3000 meters steeplechase
8 June

4 × 100 meters relay
7 June

4 × 400 meters relay
8 June

20 kilometers walk
5 June

High jump
5 June

Pole vault
7 June

Long jump
6 June

Triple jump
7 June

Shot put
7 June

Discus throw
7 June

Hammer throw
5 June

Javelin throw
6 June

Heptathlon
7–8 June

References

Results

Day 2 results
Day 3 results
Day 4 results

South American Games
2018
Athl